Senator Barham may refer to:

Charles C. Barham (1934–2010), Louisiana State Senate
Edwards Barham (1937–2014), Louisiana State Senate
Robert J. Barham (born 1949), Louisiana State Senate
Sidney B. Barham Jr. (1872–1963), Virginia State Senate